Haberlandia taiensis is a moth in the family Cossidae. It is found in Ivory Coast. The habitat consists of lowland tropical rainforests.

The wingspan is about 19.5 mm. The fore- and hindwings are deep colonial buff with buffy-olive lines.

Etymology
The species is named for the Taï National Park, the type locality.

References

Natural History Museum Lepidoptera generic names catalog

Endemic fauna of Ivory Coast
Moths described in 2011
Metarbelinae
Taxa named by Ingo Lehmann